Jayakodi is a 1940 Indian Tamil-language social problem film directed by Bhagwan Dada. The film stars K. T. Rukmini and K. Natarajan. It revolves around a girl who rebels against the dowry system in India. The film was released on 17 March 1940 and became a success. No print of it is known to survive, making it a lost film.

Plot 
Rajam, an impoverished Brahmin girl, is unmarried due to her family's inability to give dowry. Though a neighbouring family helps Rajam's family during their times of need, attempts to have her married still fail. Because of misunderstandings over money, a voracious moneylender murders Rajam's father and sets fire to their house. Rajam becomes a social activist and rebels against the dowry system. She becomes known as "Jayakodi", and prospective bridegrooms demanding dowry begin to disappear under mysterious circumstances, making people wonder what happened to them. After Rajam solves many dowry issues, she marries a man who genuinely loves her, and the couple continue their war against the dowry system.

Cast 
 K. T. Rukmini as Rajam / Jayakodi
 K. Natarajan as Rajam's husband
 Kulathu Mani
 K. Kokila
 S. Basha
 K. T. Saku Bai

Production 
Jayakodi was produced by the South Indian United Artistes Corporation and directed by Bhagwan Dada, who also wrote the story. The dialogues were written by B. V. Swamy and S. R. Sarangan. Cinematography was handled by Ahmedulla, and editing by S. Kumar.

Music 
The music of the film was composed by C. Ramchandra, while the lyrics were written by C. Murugesan.

Songs list
Song - Singer/s
Padu Mosamey - K. Kokila
Thaniye - K. Natarajan
Idhu Vakai Yaan - K. Natarajan, R. B. Lakshmi Devi
Aasai Naayagi - K. T. Saku Bai, Comedian Ambi

Release and reception 
Jayakodi was released on 17 March 1940, and became a commercial success, establishing Rukmini as a star. The film's title later became prefixed to Natarajan's name. No print of the film is known to survive, making it a lost film.

References

External links 
 

1940 films
1940 lost films
1940s Tamil-language films
Films about social issues in India
Lost Indian films